Nyhavn 43 is a historic townhouse overlooking the Nyhavn Canal in central Copenhagen, Denmark. The building was listed on the Danish registry of protected buildings and places in 1945.

History

18th century

In the late 17th century, Nyhavn 41–49 was part of one large property. It was by 1689 as No. 28 owned by tanner Villum Lydersen. The property was by 1756 as No. 22 owned by brewer  Paul Christensen Widsten (Hvidsteen). The current building  was built for him some time before 1788.

The property was later acquired by brewer Poul Christensen Hvidsten (Widsten, 1712–91). He operated a brewery at the site. At the time of the 1787 census, he resided in the building with his wife Gunnild Cecilie Hvidsteen (née Dybe), their three-year-old son Lars Christian, two brewery workers (one of them an apprentice), a caretaker, a coachman and two maids. The property was also home to two other households. Daniel Friederich Kiølmen, a ship captain, resided in the building with his wife Maria Titgen, their four children (aged two to 16) and two maids. Ole Bonsøe, a beer seller (øltapper) resided in the building with his wife Helwig Sophie Lars Datter, their two children (aged four and seven) and a maid.

After her husband's death, in 1792 Gunnild Cecilie Hvidsteen was second time married to the scholar Grímur Jónsson Thorkelin.

19th century
At the time of the 1801 census, Johnson Thorkelin and Gunhild Hvidsten resided in the building with their 11-year-old son Frederik Stephan [Thorkelin], Gunhild Camilla Hvidsten's daughter 	Jensenius Johan Hvidtsteen, two more children (aged three and four), a brewery worker and three maids. , a naval officer and adjutant general, resided in the building with his wife Elisabeth Reinhardine Fabricius-Tengnagel	m their three children (aged one to five), a chamber maid (husjomfru), a housekeeper and two maids.

In the new cadastre of 1806, the property again listed as No. 22. It was by then still owned by Thorkelin. The merchant Hans Puggaard resided in the building from 1827 to1829.

At the time of the 1834 census, No. 22 was home to four households. Jeppe Adam Hertz, a brewer and distiller, resided on the ground floor with his wife Johanne Carine, their seven children (aged six to 23), give brewery workers, three distillery workers and one maid. Hans Jacob Koefoed (1785-1870), a Supreme Court justice, resided on the first floor with his Johanne Louise Koefoed, their two-year-old son Jens Laasbye Rottbøll Koefoed, a male servant and a maid.	 Jørgen Smith (1764-1836), another judge (stiftsassessor) and kancelliråd, resided on the second floor with his wife Johanne Elisabet Smith (née Hornbech), their two children (aged eight and 16), a maid and a lodger (a civil servant).	  Frederece Jeppesen, the proprietor of a tavern in the basement, resided in the associated dwelling with his 22-year-old son Pouel Frederic Bendix Jeppesen (on a journey to Germany), four lodgers and a maid.

At the time of the 1840 census, No. 22 was home to 41 people. Hans Carl Bodenhoff, a captain in the Royal Danish Nacy, head of the 1st Division's 3rd Company, resided on the first floor with his wife Serena Bodenhoff, their three children (aged six to 18) and one maid. Frederik Rubech Bülow, a 1st Major at the Jutland Infantry Regiment, was now residing in the second floor apartment with his wife Henriette Bülow, their four children (aged 16 to 25), a maid and seven lodgers. The lodgers included the later politician Johan Christian Henrik Fischer (then a theology student) and the brothers Frederik Wilhelm Willemoes (later physician) and Joachim Godske Willemoes (later priest).

The number of residents had by 1850 declined to 25. The property was now owned by Johanne Hertz. The brewery and distillery were managed by the Christian Hertz (1820-). Johan Peter Ferdinand Ekman (1811-), a lieutenant and painter, resided in the building with his wife Anine Holgine Marie (née Jørgensen), their three children (aged two to six), a male servant and two maids. Carl Ludvig Frederik Henck (1789-1854), a professor of medicine and chief physician, resided in the building with his wife Henriette Charlotte Amalie Henck, their eight children (aged 15 to 28( and two maids. The son Johan Wilhelm Emanuel Henck (27) was an architect.

20th century

Jacobsen & Saabye, a wholesale company, was later based in the building. Founded by Louis Hansen in 1875, it was from 1919 owned by Hans Jacobsen (21 November 1872 - 8 March 1949) and A. Saabye. Saabye left the company in 1929. It was after Jacobsen's death in 1949 continued by his two children, Herman Jacobser (born 1899) and daughter J. Højby Hansen (born 1908).

Architecture
The building consists of three storeys over a high cellar and is six bays wide. The building has a black-glazed tile roof with three dormers. A small balcony is located in front of the central dormer. Under the roof runs a cornice supported by brackets. The gateway is flanked by two canon barrels to protect the corners from carriage wheels. A projecting keystone is seen over the gate.

Two former warehouses and a rear wing with stables are located in the courtyard.

Today
The building is owned by Matorion, a property company owned by Bent Fabricius-Bjerre and his two sons. It was refurbished in 1987. Restaurant Ved Kajen ("By the Quay") is located in the ground floor. The name of the restaurant refers to the title of an Osvald Helmuth song.

Gallery

References

External links

 Ved Kahen

Listed residential buildings in Copenhagen
Breweries in Copenhagen
Buildings and structures associated with the Puggaard family